Brittain Creek is a stream in Henderson County, North Carolina, in the United States. It is a tributary of Mud Creek.

The stream was named for James C. Brittain, a pioneer who settled along the creek. The name of the creek was long misspelled as Britton Creek until a descendant of James C. Brittain successfully appealed to the United States Board on Geographic Names in the 1980s.

See also
List of rivers of North Carolina

References

Rivers of Henderson County, North Carolina
Rivers of North Carolina